The Sri Lankan cricket team toured the West Indies in June 2018 to play three Test matches. The series was played for Sobers–Tissera Trophy. The tour featured Sri Lanka's first Test matches in the West Indies since April 2008 and included their first Test match at the Kensington Oval. The Test match at the Kensington Oval also became the first day/night Test to be played in the West Indies. Ahead of the Test matches, there was a three-day tour match. The Test series was drawn 1–1.

On 19 May 2018, Cricket West Indies (CWI) announced that they may scrap one of the Test fixtures, replacing it with a couple of one-day matches. However, the day before the first Test, the International Cricket Council (ICC) confirmed that it would be a three-match Test series. 

Prior to the start of day three of the second Test, the Sri Lankan cricket team protested against umpires' decision on starting the third day's play with a new ball, replacing the old ball. The Sri Lankan cricket team, led by Dinesh Chandimal, refused to take to the field on the third day of the Test, after showing its disagreement on changing the ball, causing play to be delayed by two hours. The ICC charged Chandimal with the offense of "changing the condition of the ball". Chandimal pled not guilty to the charge. Ahead of the third fixture, the ICC suspended him for one Test match, with Chandimal appealing against the decision. The ICC dismissed Chandimal's appeal, and the one-match ban was upheld. Sri Lanka Cricket (SLC) named Suranga Lakmal as the captain for the third Test of the series in Chandimal's absence. He became the sixteenth player to captain Sri Lanka in a Test match.

Squads

Ahead of the tour, Dhananjaya de Silva initially withdrew from the Sri Lankan squad following the death of his father. However, he returned to the squad ahead of the first Test. Prior to the second Test, Angelo Mathews and Lahiru Gamage were ruled out of Sri Lanka's squad for the rest of the series and were replaced by Danushka Gunathilaka and Dasun Shanaka. Shimron Hetmyer was ruled out of the final Test due to illness, with Keemo Paul replacing him in West Indies' squad. Before the third and final Test, Sri Lanka's Jeffrey Vandersay was sent home due to conduct issues.

Tour match

Three-day match: West Indies President's XI vs Sri Lanka

Test series

1st Test

2nd Test

3rd Test

Notes

References

External links
 Series home at ESPN Cricinfo

2018 in Sri Lankan cricket
2018 in West Indian cricket
International cricket competitions in 2018
Sri Lankan cricket tours of the West Indies